"Take On the World" is a song by Australian pop group Pseudo Echo.

The song entered and won the 1987 World Popular Song Festival (aka Yamaha Music Festival) in Japan.

The song was released in Japan only in October 1987. It was included on the group's third studio album, Race (1988).

Track listing 
7″ (RCA: RPS-252)
Side A "Take On the World" – 3:40
Side B "Lonely Without You" – 4:34

Yamaha Music Foundation

World Popular Song Festival

References 

1987 songs
Winners of Yamaha Music Festival
RCA Records singles
1987 singles
Pseudo Echo songs